The Eastern Townships School Board, also known as the Commission Scolaire Eastern Townships, is an anglophone school board covering the Eastern Townships in the Canadian province of Quebec. As of 2010, it oversees twenty elementary schools, three high schools, and a learning centre.

Schools

Elementary schools
Asbestos-Danville-Shipton (ADS) Elementary School (Danville)
Ayer's Cliff Elementary School (Ayer's Cliff)
Butler Elementary School (Bedford)
Cookshire Elementary School (Cookshire-Eaton)
Drummondville Elementary School (Drummondville)
Farnham Elementary School (Farnham)
Heroes' Memorial Elementary School (Cowansville)
Knowlton Academy (Brome Lake)
Lennoxville Elementary School (Sherbrooke)
Mansonville Elementary School (Mansonville)
North Hatley Elementary School (North Hatley)
Parkview Elementary School (Granby)
Pope Memorial Elementary School (Bury)
Princess Elizabeth Elementary School (Magog)
Sawyerville Elementary School (Sawyerville)
Sherbrooke Elementary School (Sherbrooke)
St. Francis Elementary School (Richmond)
Sunnyside Elementary School (Stanstead)
Sutton Elementary School (Sutton)
Waterloo Elementary School (Waterloo)

High schools
Alexander Galt Regional High School (Sherbrooke)
Massey-Vanier High School (Cowansville)
Richmond Regional High School (Richmond)

See also
Riverside School Board
New Frontiers School Board

References

External links

School districts in Quebec
Quebec English School Boards Association
Education in Montérégie
Education in Estrie
Magog, Quebec